Ruka Hirano (born 12 March 2002) is a Japanese snowboarder. He competed at the 2022 Winter Olympics.

References

External links

Living people
2002 births
Japanese male snowboarders
Snowboarders at the 2020 Winter Youth Olympics
Snowboarders at the 2022 Winter Olympics
Olympic snowboarders of Japan
Youth Olympic gold medalists for Japan
21st-century Japanese people